Sheridan is a census-designated place in Placer County, California, United States. It is located at the western edge of the county, along State Route 65. Its ZIP code is 95681 and area code 530. The population was 1,238 at the 2010 census.

History
Sheridan was originally known by the name Union Shed, before it was renamed for Philip Sheridan around the time of the American Civil War.  The Sheridan post office opened in 1868, closed for a time in 1870, and re-opened.

Governance
Sheridan is governed by the Placer County Board of Supervisors.  The Supervisor currently elected to the Sheridan area district is Robert Weygandt.  The Sheridan area has its own Municipal Advisory Committee (Sheridan MAC) which serves as an advisory board to the County's Board of Supervisors.

Geography
According to the United States Census Bureau, the CDP covers an area of 26.0 square miles (67.5 km), 99.98% of it land, and 0.02% of it water.

Climate

Demographics
The 2010 United States Census reported that Sheridan had a population of 1,238. The racial makeup of Sheridan was 1,026 (82.9%) White, 7 (0.6%) African American, 20 (1.6%) Native American, 13 (1.1%) Asian, 3 (0.2%) Pacific Islander, 113 (9.1%) from other races, and 56 (4.5%) from two or more races. Hispanic or Latino of any race were 253 persons (20.4%).

The Census reported that 1,238 people (100% of the population) lived in households, 0 (0%) lived in non-institutionalized group quarters, and 0 (0%) were institutionalized.

There were 414 households, out of which 155 (37.4%) had children under the age of 18 living in them, 238 (57.5%) were opposite-sex married couples living together, 54 (13.0%) had a female householder with no husband present, 27 (6.5%) had a male householder with no wife present.  There were 32 (7.7%) unmarried opposite-sex partnerships, and 2 (0.5%) same-sex married couples or partnerships. 68 households (16.4%) were made up of individuals, and 24 (5.8%) had someone living alone who was 65 years of age or older. The average household size was 2.99.  There were 319 families (77.1% of all households); the average family size was 3.32.

The population was spread out, with 302 people (24.4%) under the age of 18, 108 people (8.7%) aged 18 to 24, 286 people (23.1%) aged 25 to 44, 387 people (31.3%) aged 45 to 64, and 155 people (12.5%) who were 65 years of age or older.  The median age was 40.7 years. For every 100 females, there were 101.3 males.  For every 100 females age 18 and over, there were 101.7 males.

There were 447 housing units at an average density of 17.2 per square mile (6.6/km), of which 309 (74.6%) were owner-occupied, and 105 (25.4%) were occupied by renters. The homeowner vacancy rate was 2.5%; the rental vacancy rate was 0%.  907 people (73.3% of the population) lived in owner-occupied housing units and 331 people (26.7%) lived in rental housing units.

References

Census-designated places in Placer County, California
Census-designated places in California